Silvia Farina Elia and Barbara Schett were the defending champions, but none competed this year. Schett represented Austria at the Hopman Cup in Perth, which was held at the same week.

Cara Black and Alexandra Fusai won the title by defeating Barbara Schwartz and Patricia Wartusch 3–6, 6–3, 6–4 in the final.

Seeds

Draw

Draw

References
 Official results archive (ITF)
 Official results archive (WTA)

WTA Auckland Open